Eisenstein is a surname which may refer to:

 Bruce Eisenstein, American electrical engineer and academic
 Charles Eisenstein, American author, speaker and activist
 Daniel Eisenstein (born 1970), American cosmologist and academic
 Elizabeth Eisenstein (1923-2016), American historian
 Gotthold Eisenstein (1823-1852), German mathematician
 Ira Eisenstein (1906-2001), American rabbi who cofounded Reconstructionist Judaism
 James P. Eisenstein (born 1952), American physicist
 Julius Eisenstein (1854-1956), Russian-American writer and contributor to the Jewish Encyclopedia
 Laura Eisenstein (1942-1985), American physicist
 Linda Eisenstein, American playwright and composer
 Mayer Eisenstein (1946-2014), American physician and anti-vaccine activist
 Mikhail Eisenstein (1867–1921), Russian architect
 Odile Eisenstein (born 1949), French theoretical chemist
 Phyllis Eisenstein (1946-2020), American science fiction and fantasy writer
 Sergei Eisenstein (1898–1948), Soviet film director
Zillah Eisenstein, (fl. 2021) American political scientist and gender studies scholar

References

German-language surnames
Jewish surnames
Yiddish-language surnames